Francis Ariioehau Sanford (11 May 1912 – 21 December 1996) was a French Polynesian politician. He served as a member of the French National Assembly from 1967 until 1978.

Early life
Sanford was born in Papeete and had an American grandfather. He initially worked in the docks, before becoming a waiter and then a teacher. After 1932, he became a civil servant, becoming Station chief in the Gambier Islands. In 1939 he married Elisa Snow, with whom he had five children. During World War II he rallied the "Free French" and acted as liaison officer to the Americans in  Bora Bora. After the war he returned to education, working as a teacher in Bora Bora. In 1956 he was appointed Director of Primary Education in the French Polynesian government.

Political career
In 1965 Sanford was elected mayor of Faa'a. In the 1967 elections to the French National Assembly, he was elected as the French Polynesian deputy, defeating incumbent MP John Teariki by 13,633 votes to 13,285. In the National Assembly he initially joined the Independent Republicans, before switching to the Progress and Modern Democracy group following the 1968 elections. He later joined the Reformist Movement after its foundation in 1972.

He remained a member of the National Assembly until 1978, and later served as President of French Polynesia's Council of Government. He was also the founder of the Aia Api party. He retired from politics in 1985.

References

1912 births
People from Papeete
French Polynesian educators
French Polynesian civil servants
Mayors of places in French Polynesia
Members of the National Assembly (France)
Aia Api politicians
1996 deaths
Members of the Tahitian Academy